Distro Kuomboka were formed at Kabwe in 1979. They are Zambia's longest surviving band . Recognised as Zambia's Best Band at the Ngoma National Music Awards (2004)  and Best Band in the Copperbelt at the Mukuba Music Awards (2005) , Distro Kuomboka are now the resident band at the Mukuba Hotel, in the Copperbelt town of Ndola. Their album releases include Dyonko, Twalebana, Toto-Mitala, Kaoma, The Best of Distro Kuomboka, Ichili Pamunobe and Lamba Bull.

Zambian musical groups
Musical groups established in 1979
1979 establishments in Zambia